Eifelwall/Stadtarchiv is a station on the Cologne Stadtbahn line 18, located in the Cologne district of Lindenthal. The station lies on Luxemburger Straße, adjacent to nearby Eifelwall, after which the station is named. It is also right next to the extensive parks of the inner green belt.

The station was opened in 1898 and consists of one island platform with two rail tracks.

On December 13th, 2020, the station was renamed from Eifelwall to Eifelwall/Stadtarchiv, because of the new building of the Historical Archive of Cologne that's adjacent to it.

See also 
 List of Cologne KVB stations

References

External links 
 station info page 

Cologne KVB stations
Lindenthal, Cologne
Railway stations in Germany opened in 1898